Tad's Swimming Hole is a 1918 American silent short comedy film directed by King Vidor. It was the fourth of a series of twenty films funded by Judge Willis Brown as both moral lessons and promotional films.

Cast
 Ernest Butterworth
 Ruth Hampton
 Guy Hayman
 Ernest Butterworth Jr.
 Thomas Bellamy

Reception
Like many American films of the time, Tad's Swimming Hole was subject to cuts by city and state film censorship boards. For example, the Chicago Board of Censors cut all closeups of naked boys facing the camera.

References

External links

1918 films
1918 comedy films
1918 short films
Films directed by King Vidor
Silent American comedy films
American silent short films
American black-and-white films
American comedy short films
1910s American films